Danlí is a city and a municipality in Honduras. It is currently the fourth most populated municipality in Honduras, located approximately 92 kilometers southeast of Tegucigalpa, in the Honduran department of El Paraíso known for its production of cigars and corn (maize). The city is situated at an altitude of 814 meters (2,673 feet) above sea level and has a population of 75,420 (2020 calculation) The population of the municipality (2018) is 214,566 people which is composed of 105,929 men and 108,637 women.  With a population in the urban area of 85,075 people and in the rural area of 129,491 people.

Nature 
The official flower is the napoleón, a type of bougainvillea. The official tree is the jiñicuado (bursera simaruba), which is considered to be so easy to grow that a stake driven into the ground will take root. The official mammal is the howler monkey, an endangered species that inhabits the broad-leaf forests of the Apagüíz and Apapuerta mountains.
 
The region also has pine forests. In general, pine forests are on the north-facing slopes while the broad-leaf forests are on south-facing slopes. Other fauna around Danlí include deer and several species of birds, such as the oropendula, parrot and mynah. Residents of rural areas near Danlí have reported jaguar and quetzal sightings.

A landmark is the mountain of Apagüíz, which has a prominent stone outcropping near the summit and is visible from the southern parts of the city.

Danli Prison 
According to the documentary presented by Paul Connolly, as opening episode of the series Inside the World's Toughest Prisons, Danli prison already hosted more than twice the inmates it was intended to hold in 2016. The notorious Centro Penal de Danlí even allows its inmates to enforce their own rules.
Prisons in Honduras are in general desperately overcrowded – in September 2019 reports disclosed that they operated at 204% of their capacity. Besides that more than half of the detainees are still waiting for their court hearing. Besides that Law enforcement in Honduras is underfinanced to an extent that escapes, drug abuse and corruption are common and even riots and target killings often cannot be prevented, as InSight Crime accounts.

Roman Catholic Suffragan Diocese 
Since 2017, the city is the episcopal see of the Roman Catholic Diocese of Danlí, a suffragan diocese in the ecclesiastical province of the Metropolitan Roman Catholic Archdiocese of Tegucigalpa.

Notable People from Danlí, El Paraíso
Alba Consuelo Flores, Secretary of Health of the Republic of Honduras

References 

Municipalities of the El Paraíso Department